Jonathan Wong Chee-Hynn (王梓軒), born June 3, 1986, is a Hong Kong singer-songwriter, actor and producer.

Biography 

Born in the United States, Jonathan picked up the piano and violin at the age of 6 and began taking a serious interest in dance during his high school years at Milton Academy.

Jonathan is trained in various martial arts. Judo (since age 11), Wrestling (varsity team in high school), Hung Kuen (洪拳), Wing Chun (詠春) and San Da (散打) since 2012.

Jonathan graduated from Cornell University in 2008, double majoring in Psychology and Dance, where he sang in the Cornell University Glee Club and also was music director and arranger for the university's premiere all-male a cappella group "Last Call". His vocal arrangements and solo performances helped "Last Call" secure numerous national and international awards, while his achievements in dance made him the single recipient of the 2008 Cornell Undergraduate Artist Award.

He joined the Hong Kong music industry in 2009 and has since released four Cantonese albums – “Beyond Singing”, “Spectrum” and “Out of Frame”, one Mandarin album – “Rising” and two Japanese singles.  His singles became instant hits on the Hong Kong and Guangzhou pop charts and have earned him over 50 music awards in the new singer and singer-songwriter categories thus far.

In 2010, Jonathan joined Avex Group, a top music label in Japan, and became the first ever international artist jointly developed by the group's domestic and international departments.

Jonathan accomplished a series of remarkable professional developments in 2011. He became a talk show host in a popular TVB J2 Channel program called “Big Boys Club” from August 2011, and has been a host of that show till now. On the same year, Jonathan was invited by Tokyo’s TBS TV Station to represent Hong Kong and lead an A Cappella group as its conductor and arranger to compete against the Japanese team at a prime time international talent show. Jonathan and his team thrilled the audience with their passionate and innovative performance and defeated their strong Japanese competitors.

In May 2012,  Jonathan was invited to be a guest composer at the Hong Kong University of Science and Technology's (HKUST's) "The Intimacy of Creativity" concert presented by Prof Bright Sheng, one of the world's best known composers/ conductors. At the concert he performed also as a vocalist for his own composition with a group of award-winning international and regional musicians and composers. In June, Jonathan released his first Mandarin album "Rising". Songs on the album became pop-chart favorites and received critical acclaims for his efforts to collaborate with top-notch producers/ singer-songwriters including Eric Kwok, Edward Chan, Hins Cheung, Taz Tan, Khalil Fong and Chiu Tsang Hei.

On August 10–11, 2012, Jonathan held his debut solo concert at the Hong Kong Convention and Exhibition Centre to thousands of fans. The two full-house concerts was a big success, and Jonathan's multiple talents in singing, dancing, music composition and instrumental performances won immense audience and media support.

In April 2013, released his first single of the year "跳火坑 Double Down".

In February 2014, Jonathan released "你最好 All of You".

On September 29, 2014, Jonathan released his fifth album "A Fighter's Confession 戰士。告白" on iTunes Worldwide. The album includes 14 songs, including chart-topping No.1 songs "跳火坑 Double Down", "你最好 All of You", and "千色 Fighting For". "Fighting For", which was also the name of the short musical, was selected by the Hanoi International Film Festival 2014 to premiere in Asia, and was the only Hong Kong short film to be in competition with 30 other shorts.

In addition to singing and hosting TV talk shows, Jonathan also acts in TV dramas and films. His roles include: a policeman in "Tales from the Dark Part 1″; a martial arts fighter in "Ip Man: The Final Fight" (葉問: 終極一戰); a terrorist in a TVB action drama series "Tiger Cubs 2 (飛虎2)"; an adroit young entrepreneur in "Queen Divas" (新抱喜相逢); and a law enforcer in "The Battles of Tomorrow" (再戰明天).

In "Limelight Years" (2015), Jonathan plays an exceptionally gifted musician driven to the edge of his sanity by the pressures of life under the limelight. The role not only helped Jon earn his first "Best Supporting Actor in a Television Drama" nomination, it also earned him a part in Johnnie To's thriller "Three" (2016), which was critically acclaimed by local and international media critics including: The Hollywood Reporter and Variety.

In 2016, Jonathan joined the largest original singer-songwriting competition in the world, Sing My Song, which was aired extensively in China CCTV-3. He joined Chinese R&B legend David Tao's songwriting team and was the only Hong Kong representative to make it into the top 6 of his team. On the same year, the song “Beyond Borders” that he composed for singer Karen Mok has gathered more than 35 million click-through rate online. Since then, he has the privilege to have written songs for Karen Mok, Sammi Zheng, and China's pop boy band XNINE, etc.

In the past 2 years, Jonathan completed filming for motion pictures "Love Only" (2018), co-starring Korean pop idol Seung-ri, from BIG BANG; "The House of Rising Sons" (2018), a story based on legendary Hong Kong band, The Wynners; as well as the Dynasty Warriors (2020).

He has also finished filming three television series "OMG, Your Honour" (2018) of which he plays a talented young barrister searching for himself in the challenging world of law; a romantic comedy, "Wonder Women" (2019) in which he plays an entrepreneur who gives up everything to win the affections of a jaded businesswoman; and an action TV series "Airport Security Unit (ASU)" (2020) where he plays an amiable yet effective member of the airport special forces unit.

He performed in "Matteo Ricci" (2019),  an original theatrical musical in which he plays the title role, Italian priest Matteo Ricci, the first westerner to enter the Forbidden City and be buried on Chinese soil.

Discography

Chinese albums 

 "Beyond Singing 超越聲音 (CD+DVD)" (Oct 27, 2009)
 "Beyond Singing 超越聲音 (CD+DVD) 2nd Edition" (December 4, 2009)
 "Spectrum 超越東西 (CD+DVD)" (March 31, 2010)
 "Out Of Frame 超越格式 (CD+DVD)" (April 8, 2011)
 "Rising (CD+DVD)" (June 9, 2012)
 "A Fighter's Confession (CD+DVD)" (September 30, 2014)

Digital singles 

 "Double Down (跳火坑)" (April 23, 2013)
 "Double Down A Cappella Version Feat. Peter Hollens (April 23, 2013)
 "Invincible (萬夫莫敵)" (September 24, 2013)
 "All Of You (你最好)" (February 20, 2014)
 "Run" (June 15, 2014)
 "Fighting For" (千色) (August 7, 2014)
 "Good Fight" (次世代) (April 23, 2015)
 "Taste It Don't Waste It  ft. Hanjin Tan" (點止冰冰 Feat. 陳奐仁) (July 10, 2015)
 "Grown Up Christmas List ft. Justin Lo" (December 24, 2015)
 "For the First Time" (碰不上會更美) (February 29, 2016)
 "All The Best" (平常心) (July 25, 2016)
 "Who Am I" (我是誰) x Trouze (Sept 26, 2016)
 "The Void" (寄居太虛) (Oct 8, 2018)
 "Gravity" (邊緣引力) (Oct 29, 2018)
 "Nocturne No.17" (夜曲17章) (Nov 27, 2018)

Japanese album 

 "Kimi wa bara yori utsukushii 君は薔薇より美しい (CD+DVD)" (June 15, 2011)
 "Bokugiru 僕がいる (single)" (August, 2011)

Filmography / Micro film

Television

Television Hosting

Awards and nominations

2008
 2008 Cornell Undergraduate Artist Award

2009
 Best New Artist, TVB 8 Mandarin Music On Demand Awards Presentation; Silver
 New Artist Award, Metro Radio Mandarin Music Awards
 Soaring New Artist, TVB Jade Solid Gold Music Awards Selection Third Round
 New Artist Award (Male Singer-songwriter), Metro Radio Hit Music Awards
 New Male Singer Award, Commercial Radio Ultimate Song Chart Awards Presentation; Silver
 Most Popular New Artist, TVB Jade Solid Gold Music Awards; Silver
 Most Promising New Artist, 32nd Annual RTHK Music Awards; Bronze
 New Artist Award (HK/Taiwan), Sprite Music Awards China

2010
 Best Original Composition & Best Singer-Songwriter, Metro Radio Mandarin Music Awards; "幾米的距離"
 Singer-songwriter award, Metro Radio Hit Music Awards
 Most Popular Singer-songwriter; TVB Jade Solid Gold Music Awards; Silver
 Best New Artist, Global Chinese Music Awards
 Best Singer-songwriter; TVB 8 Mandarin Music On Demand Awards Presentation; Bronze
 Singer-songwriter award, 7th Hit Song Awards

2011
 Best Song Award - TVB Jade Solid Gold Music Awards Selection Second Round - "Toy Story" (玩具也流淚)
 Outstanding Performance, TVB Jade Solid Gold Music Awards, Gold
 Best Performing Artist Award, Metro Radio Hit Music Awards
 Best Original Composition & Best Singer-Songwriter, Metro Radio Mandarin Music Awards; "盛宴"
 Best Improved Artist Award; Music Pioneer Chart

2012
 Most Popular Mandarin Song, TVB Jade Solid Gold Selection Second Round; "Your Song"
 Best Original Composition & Best Performance; Metro Radio Mandarin Music Awards; "兩人三腳"
 Most Improved Artist Award & Best Singer-songwriter Award, Music Pioneer Chart

2013
 Best Original Composition & Most Popular Idol Awards, Metro Radio Mandarin Music Awards; "La La La"
 Best Performing Artist Award, Music Pioneer Chart
 Singer-songwriter & Best Original Composition; Metro Radio Hit Music Awards; Gold; "Double Down 跳火坑"

2014
 Best Song Award, TVB Jade Solid Gold Music Awards Selection Second Road; "千色" (Fighting For)
 Male Singer Award & Hit Song Award, Metro Radio Hit Music Awards; "千色" (Fighting For)
 Most Popular Singer-songwriter, Roadshow Song Chart Awards
 Best Performing Artist Award, Music Pioneer Chart
 Best Dance Song Award, 2014 TVB Jade Solid Gold Awards;Silver;"千色" (Fighting For)

Radio Drama 

 2012: CR903 - 熱血樂章; Voice: Hynn
 2013: Metro Radio - Narcotics Campaign Radio Drama (戒不太遲)Voice; Mr. Hui

Concert

References

External links 

  on Facebook
  on Instagram

1986 births
Living people
Cornell University alumni
Hong Kong male singers
Hong Kong male actors
TVB actors